Vamshidhar Pande known by Alias Kalu Pande was a Nepalese politician and military general who was appointed as Kaji of The Gorkha Kingdom. He was born in 1713 A.D. in Gorkha. He was the commander of the Gorkhali forces during the Unification Campaign of Nepal who died in the first Battle of Kirtipur in 1757 A.D. Pande's real name was Banshidhar Pande. He was a son of Kaji Bhimraj Pande who was minister during reign of King Prithivipati Shah of Gorkha. He was descendant of Minister of Gorkha and Dravya Shah's accomplice Ganesh Pande. He had three sons: Dewan Kajisaheb Vamsharaj Pande, Sardar Ranasur Pande and Mulkaji Sahib Damodar Pande (1st PM of Nepal).

Family

Pande was born in 1713 A.D to Kaji Bhimraj Pande.  He was a descendant of Ganesh Pande, who was the first Kaji (Prime Minister) of King Dravya Shah of Gorkha Kingdom established in 1559 A.D. The Pandes were considered as Thar Ghar or aristrocratic family who assisted in the administration of Gorkha Kingdom. Kaji Kalu Pande (1714-1757) belonged to this family and became a war hero after he died at Battle of Kirtipur. These Pandes were categorized with fellow Chhetri Bharadars such as Thapas, Basnyats and Kunwar family.

Relation with Kaji Tularam Pande
Generally, historians conclude his relation to Kaji Tularam Pande of Gorkha. As per Historian Baburam Acharya, Tularam was a brother (first cousin) of Kaji Bhimraj Pande, the father of Kalu Pande. However, Historian Rishikesh Shah contends that Tularam was a brother of Kalu Pande.

Career 
Kalu Pande was made the Commander-in-Chief of the Gorkhali Army after Biraj Thapa Magar and his first major Battle was the Battle of Kirtipur. Despite his initial resentment to the fact that the valley kings were well prepared and the Gorkhalis were not, Pande gave a 'Yes' to the operation, due to being insisted by Prithvi Narayan Shah. The Gorkhalis had set up a base on Naikap, a hill on the valley's western rim, from where they were to mount their assaults on Kirtipur. They were armed with swords, bows and arrows and muskets.

Battle of Kirtipur

The Battle of Kirtipur occurred in 1767 during the Gorkha conquest of Nepal, and was fought at Kirtipur, one of the principal towns in the Kathmandu Valley. Kirtipur was then a walled town of 800 houses and part of the kingdom of Lalitpur. It is spread along the top of a ridge.

The battle between the Newars of the valley and the invading Gorkhalis marked a turning point in the war of expansion launched by Gorkhali king Prithvi Narayan Shah. It led to his subjugation of the rest of the coveted valley and the end of Newar rule.
The Gorkhalis had set up a base on Dahachok, a hill on the valley's western rim, from where they mounted their assaults on Kirtipur. They were armed with swords, bows and arrows and muskets.

During the first assault in 1757, the Gorkhali army was badly beaten. As they advanced towards Kirtipur, the Newars went to meet them under the command of Kaji Danuvanta. The two forces fought on the plain of Tyangla Phant in the north-west of Kirtipur.  The Newars defended their town ferociously. The Gorkhali commander Kalu Pande was killed, and the Gorkhali king himself barely escaped with his life into the surrounding hills disguised as a saint.

The Valley Kings brought a large number of Doyas from Indian Plains under Shaktiballabh sardar. During the first assault in 1757, the Gorkhali army killed 1200 enemies, mostly Doyas, but were badly beaten themselves. Both sides suffered heavy losses. As they advanced towards Kirtipur, the combined force of Valley Kings under Kaji Gangadhar Jha, Kaji Gangaram Thapa and Sardar Shaktiballabh brought Havoc to the outnumbered Gorkhalis. The two forces fought on the plain of Tyangla Phant in the northwest of Kirtipur. Surapratap Shah, the King's brother lost his right eye to an arrow while scaling the city wall. The Gorkhali commander Kaji Kalu Pande was beheaded by kantipur's king jay prakash malla himself, and the Gorkhali king himself narrowly escaped with his life into the surrounding hills disguised as a saint.

King's disheartenment
King Prithvi Narayan Shah's letter to Sardar Ramakrishna Kunwar mentioned by historian Baburam Acharya quotes disheartenment of King Prithvi over death of Kalu Pande: "When Kalu Pande was killed in Kirtipur, I had felt disheartened, thinking that I had not been able to conquer the three towns of Nepal."

Marital Relationship with Basnyats

King Prithvi Narayan Shah formed an alliance with Basnyat and Pande families of Gorkha in his quest for the unification of Nepal. As per his Divya Upadesh, King Prithvi Narayan is known to have arranged the marriage between Kaji Kehar Singh Basnyat, the second son of Senapati Badabir Shivaram Singh Basnyat, and Mukhiyani Chitra Devi, the daughter of Kaji Kalu Pande. Shivaram Singh Basnyat was addressed as Senapati Badabir (Brave Chief of the Army) in all the documents of that era. He died in the defensive battle of Sanga Chowk during Unification of Nepal on 1803 B.S.

Kalu Pande memorial

The burial ground of Kaji Kalu Pande on a hill top. It lies in Chandragiri, western outskirts of Kathmandu from where Gorkha can be seen. It is said that Kalu Pande requested to be burried where he could see his homeland of Gorkha so, he was burried in that spot. It is also called Kalu Pande Hill and is a popular hiking spot.

Gallery

References 

1713 births
1757 deaths
18th-century Nepalese nobility
Burials in Nepal
Nepalese generals
Nepalese military personnel killed in action
Pande family
People from Gorkha District
People of the Nepalese unification
Unification of Nepal
Nepalese Hindus